Unitarism may refer to:

 Political unitarism, political doctrine advocating for creation of a unitary state
 Ethnic unitarism, a form of ethnic homogenization 
 Cultural unitarism, a form of cultural homogenization 
 Unitarism (management), a term in human resource management

See also
 Unionism (disambiguation)
 Unitarianism (disambiguation)